William Cookworthy (12 April 170517 October 1780) was an English Quaker minister, a successful pharmacist and an innovator in several fields of technology. He was the first person in Britain to discover how to make hard-paste porcelain, like that imported from China.  He subsequently discovered china clay in Cornwall.  In 1768 he founded a works at Plymouth for the production of Plymouth porcelain; in 1770 he moved the factory to Bristol, to become Bristol porcelain, before selling it to a partner in 1773.

Parents, birth, siblings and early life
He was born of Quaker parents in Kingsbridge, Devon on 12 April 1705. His father, also called William, was a weaver and his mother was Edith, the daughter of John and Margaret Debell of St Martin-by-Looe in east Cornwall: they had married in 1704. Their children were:

 William – 1705
 Sarah – 1706
 Jacob – 1709
 Susannah – 1711
 Mary – 1714
 Philip – 1716
 Benjamin – 1717

William was a bright child but his education was halted when his father died on 22 October 1718 and the family's investment in the South Sea Company failed in the autumn of 1720.

William had been offered an apprenticeship, at no cost, by the Bevan Brothers, two Quaker apothecaries, with a successful business in London. As the family had no spare money, William walked to London to take up the offer and, eventually, completed the apprenticeship.  He was taken into partnership.

Plymouth
He moved to Plymouth, where he set up a pharmacy as Bevan and Cookworthy. This flourished. He eventually brought his brothers Philip and Benjamin into the partnership and bought out the Bevans' interest in 1745.  He became prominent among Devon Quakers, being appointed as an Elder.  Among his concerns was that Quakers should not tolerate their members trading in prize goods (ships and their cargoes seized in war), as Quakers should not benefit from war.

The manufacture of porcelain was at the time attracting great attention in England, and while the factories at Bow, Chelsea, Worcester and Derby were introducing the artificial glassy porcelain, Cookworthy, following the accounts from China of the Jesuit priest Père d'Entrecolles, spent many years in searching for English materials similar to those used in China. From 1745 onwards he seems to have travelled over the greater portion of Cornwall and Devon in search of these minerals, and he finally located them in the parish of St Stephen's near St Austell. With a certain amount of financial assistance from Thomas Pitt (afterwards 1st Baron Camelford) he established the Plymouth China Factory at least as early as 1768.

The factory was moved to Bristol about 1770, and the business was afterwards sold to Richard Champion and others and became the Bristol Porcelain Manufactory. Although the Plymouth porcelain was not of high quality, Cookworthy is remembered for his discovery of those abundant supplies of English clay and rocks which later formed the foundation of English porcelain and earthenware.

Marriage
In 1735, he married Sarah Berry, a Quaker from Wellington in Somerset. They had five daughters:
 Lydia – 1736
 Sarah – 1738
 Mary – 1740
 Elizabeth & Susannah (twins) – 1743

Lighthouse engineering
He was also an associate of John Smeaton, who lodged at his house when he was engaged in building the third Eddystone Lighthouse (1756–59). Cookworthy helped Smeaton with the development of hydraulic lime, which was essential to the successful building of the lighthouse.

Swedenborg
In 1767 Cookworthy, in conjunction with Rev Thomas Hartley, translated Emanuel Swedenborg's theological works, The Doctrine of Life, Treatise on Influx, and Heaven and Hell, from Latin into English.

His initial reaction to Swedenborg's works was one of disgust, but with persistence, he was convinced of their merits and was a persuasive advocate. Hartley and Cookworthy later visited Swedenborg at his lodgings in Clerkenwell shortly before Swedenborg's death.

Friends
It is also known that prior to his departure, Captain James Cook, Captain John Jervis, and the naturalists Dr Solander and Sir Joseph Banks, were guests of Cookworthy. He also visited Daniel Gumb, the "Mountain Philosopher" who lived amongst the rocks at Cheesewring.

References

Bibliography
Early New Church Worthies by the Rev Dr Jonathon Bayley
Cookworthy's Plymouth and Bristol Porcelain by F.Severne Mackenna(1947) published by F.Lewis
William Cookworthy 1705–1780: a study of the pioneer of true porcelain manufacture in England by John Penderill-Church, Truro, Bradford Barton (1972).

English chemists
People from Kingsbridge
English Quakers
1705 births
1780 deaths
Ceramics manufacturers of England
English Swedenborgians
English pharmacists
Devonian pottery